Hexapod may refer to:

Things with six limbs, e.g. a hexapod chair would have six not the traditional four limbs

Biology
 Hexapoda, a subphylum of arthropods including the insects
 Hexapodidae, a family of crabs

Technology
 Hexapod (robotics), a mechanical vehicle that walks on six legs
 Stewart platform, a machine platform supported by six struts, used in robotics
 Hexapod-Telescope, a telescope in Chile mounted on a Stewart platform chassis frame

See also
 Tetrapod
 Octopod